The Tien Shan vole (Microtus ilaeus) is a species of rodent in the family Cricetidae. It is found in Afghanistan, Kazakhstan, Kyrgyzstan, Tajikistan, and Turkmenistan.

References

Musser, G. G. and M. D. Carleton. 2005. Superfamily Muroidea. pp. 894–1531 in Mammal Species of the World a Taxonomic and Geographic Reference. D. E. Wilson and D. M. Reeder eds. Johns Hopkins University Press, Baltimore.

Microtus
Mammals of Afghanistan
Mammals described in 1912
Taxa named by Oldfield Thomas
Taxonomy articles created by Polbot